The Gretsch G1627 Synchromatic Sparkle Jet is a guitar best known for being used by Matt Bellamy of Muse.

References 

Gretsch electric guitars